Steve Pederson is an American sound engineer. He won an Academy Award for Best Sound and was nominated for another in the same category. He has worked on more than 130 films since 1978.

Selected filmography
Pederson won an Academy Award for Best Sound and has been nominated for another one:

Won
 Apollo 13 (1995)

Nominated
 Schindler's List (1993)

References

External links

Year of birth missing (living people)
Living people
American audio engineers
Best Sound Mixing Academy Award winners